Indra Sjafri (born 2 February 1963 in Pesisir Selatan, West Sumatra) is a former Indonesian football player and Technical director of the Indonesia and currently interim head coach of Indonesia U-23.  Before getting into coaching, he was a branch manager at Pos Indonesia. He holds a Bachelor of Economics degree from Andalas University.

Coaching license
 License C (1997)
 License B (1998)
 License A (1999)
 License Pro (2019)

Managerial career 
Indra led 

On December 17, 2014, he was appointed to be the head coach of Bali United.

Honours 
Indonesia U-19
 AFF U-19 Youth Championship
 Champions : 2013
 Third Place : 2017, 2018

Indonesia U-23
 AFF U-22 Youth Championship
 Champions : 2019

 SEA Games
Silver Medalist   : 2019

 Merlion Cup
Third Place : 2019

References

External links 
 Indra Sjafri profile

1963 births
Living people
Bali United F.C. managers
Association football midfielders
Indonesian footballers
Indonesian football managers
Indonesia national football team managers
Minangkabau people
People from Pesisir Selatan Regency
Sportspeople from West Sumatra
Andalas University alumni